Lakota West High School is a four-year, public high school in West Chester Township, a suburb of Cincinnati, Ohio, United States. It is a member of the Lakota Local School District, which comprises both West Chester Township and Liberty Township. The district was originally unified under one high school, Lakota High School, until 1997 when the district expanded and formed two new high schools – Lakota West and Lakota East. Enrollment for Lakota West exceeds 2,500 students, and the school's radio station, WLHS 89.9 FM, is a remnant of the former high school and is staffed by students from both Lakota East and Lakota West.

The OHSAA Division 1 school's mascot is the Firebird, derived from the former district's mascot, the Thunderbird, and the school colors are red and white with black trim. Sports teams compete as a member of the Greater Miami Conference (GMC). The school year is divided into two semesters with two quarters each.

Clubs and activities
After-school clubs and activities ranging from Peer Counseling to Hope Squad to the school chapter of Mu Alpha Theta. Other clubs and activities include student government (SGA), HOSA, Chess Club, Marching Band, and Jazz Club, as well as Theatre and Wrestling.

The West Press (Formerly known as The Voice)
The West Press is a student-operated publication for Lakota West High School. It is a free publication distributed at Lakota West High School through their website, lwhspress.com.

The West Press, Which at the time was known as The Voice, was a winner of fourteen first-place awards, including the 2000 Pacemaker Award, 2001 Gold Medalist CSPA, NSPA All-American Award, and GLIPA Buckeye Award.

Athletics
Lakota West is a member of the Greater Miami Conference in the Ohio High School Athletic Association. Lakota West's athletic teams are known at the Firebirds. The school's primary rival is neighboring school Lakota East High School.

OHSAA State Championships
 Girls Soccer - 1999, 2019
 Girls Basketball - 2015
 Girls Softball - 2022
 Girls Golf - 2006
 Boys Baseball - 2007
 Boys Golf - 2000

 Boys Cross Country - 2020
 Girls Softball - 2022

As Lakota High School:
Girls Volleyball - 1994
Boys Basketball - 1992
Girls Cross Country - 1984
Girls Cross Country - 1983

Ohio High School Athletic Association State Runner-up

 Girls Basketball- 2008

The Lakota West Marching Firebirds 
Lakota West High School is home to the Lakota West Marching Firebirds.  Lakota West has received Super Ratings from various Ohio Music Education Association (OMEA) competitions since the high schools opening, and it's top band, The Lakota West Symphonic Winds, has played in the esteemed Midwest Clinic six times total, with their most recent performance in 2023.

Lakota West has participated in numerous Bands of America Regional and Super Regional Championships, and has been a Semi-finalist twice in the Bands of America Grand National Championships (placing 24th and 25th, respectively). The band is a consecutive two-year winner of the Bands of America Obetz Regional.

Notable alumni
Nick Hagglund, soccer player
John Conner, NFL fullback 
Jordan Hicks, NFL linebacker
Ryan Kelly, NFL offensive lineman
Jacob May, MLB outfielder
Mitra Jouhari, comedian and writer
Marissa Steen, Professional Golfer

Notes and references

High schools in Butler County, Ohio
Public high schools in Ohio
1997 establishments in Ohio